Presentation College or Presentation Brothers College can refer to:

Australia
 Iona Presentation College, Perth
 Presentation College, Moe, now part of Lavalla Catholic College
 Presentation College, Windsor, Melbourne

Grenada
 Presentation Brothers College (Grenada)

Ireland
 Presentation Brothers College, Cork
 Presentation College, Bray, County Wicklow
 Presentation College Headford, County Mayo

Trinidad and Tobago
 Presentation College, Chaguanas
 Presentation College, San Fernando

United Kingdom
 Presentation College, Reading, Berkshire, now called Elvian School

United States
 Presentation College, South Dakota, with a branch campus in Minnesota

See also
 Presentation Brothers
 Presentation High School (disambiguation)
 Presentation Sisters